The Consulate General of the United States of America in Hyderabad is a United States diplomatic mission located in Hyderabad. The consulate provides visa and consular services to the Indian citizens in Telangana, Andhra Pradesh and Odisha. It is housed in the historic Paigah Palace. It was the United States government's first new consulate general anywhere in the world since 1985, and also the first new United States consulate general in India since its independence in 1947. The current Consul General is Jennifer Larson, incumbent since September 2022. She was preceded by Joel Reifman who took over office on 20 August 2019.

A new consulate general office is expected to be operational by early 2023 to cater to the regional needs for the next 20 years.

History 

Until the consulate opened in Hyderabad, the Consulate General of the United States, Chennai received about 40% of its visa applications from Andhra Pradesh. In early 2006, the then Chief Minister of the State Y. S. Rajasekhara Reddy announced that the United States government has agreed to open a consulate in the capital city of Hyderabad. He also announced steps to provide temporary and permanent accommodation to the consular staff. This announcement came soon after the visit of President of the United States George W. Bush to the state capital. Hyderabad was chosen because of "its strategic location in terms of a large visa demand, a broad-based economy spanning information technology, bio-technology and other life sciences besides a diverse population, including Muslims." Soon after this, the then United States Ambassador to India David Campbell Mulford announced that the consulate will begin its operations in 2007 and inauguration planned for 2008. The purpose of opening the consulate in Hyderabad was to reduce the burden of the consulate in Chennai that issues the highest number of visas in India.

In 2007, United States signed an agreement with the local government to lease the Paigah Palace for five years. Mulford announced that the palace will be renovated to serve as a temporary accommodation for the consulate. The state government designated  in the city's Financial District where a permanent consulate would be built, and is expected to be ready for use in Mid-2022.

In 2008, the facility opened with the capacity to process 100 visa applications in a day. The consulate first started interviewing visa applicants from 10 March 2009 and in a year's time it interviewed 100,000 applicants. In the years following its opening, the number of students traveling to the United States from Telangana and Andhra Pradesh increased significantly. 

US consulate in Hyderabad will be shifting its own new building built in Nanakramguda, Financial District on 20 March 2023. Spread across a sprawling 12.3-acre site and built at a cost of US$ 340 million, this is the largest US consular processing campus in-South East Asia, both in terms of the number of visa windows and in area. In January 2023, the Visa Application Center (VAC) used for biometrics appointments, IW submissions & passport collection moved to Lower Concourse, HITEC City metro station, while actual visa interviews will continue at the US Consulate in Hyderabad.

Activities 
The consulate has conducted activities that foster and promote education in the United States, Indo-US business ties and social causes such as renovation of a two-centuries-old tomb of Mah Laqa Bai, a Nizam-era Urdu poet and courtesan.

See also
 Embassy of the United States, New Delhi
 Consulate General of the United States, Kolkata
 Consulate General of the United States, Chennai
 Consulate General of the United States, Mumbai

References

External links
 Official US CG Hyderabad webpage
 
 

Diplomatic missions in India
Hyderabad
United States
India–United States relations